The 1916 Columbia Lions football team was an American football team that represented Columbia University as an independent during the 1916 college football season. In their second year after a ten-year hiatus and second year with head coach T. Nelson Metcalf, the Lions followed their undefeated 1915 season with a 1–5–2 campaign, and were outscored  by opponents.  The team played its home games on South Field, part of the university's campus in Morningside Heights in Upper Manhattan.

Schedule

References

Columbia
Columbia Lions football seasons
Columbia Lions football